Oncideres schreiteri is a species of beetle in the family Cerambycidae. It was described by Bruch in 1941. It is known from Argentina.

References

schreiteri
Beetles described in 1941